Yassine Lakhal is a Moroccan footballer who plays currently. He also played for the Moroccan Olympic national team.

References

External links

1989 births
Living people
Moroccan footballers
Moroccan expatriate footballers
Moghreb Tétouan players
Wydad AC players
AS FAR (football) players
Al-Ahli SC (Tripoli) players
Chabab Rif Al Hoceima players
Al-Ain FC (Saudi Arabia) players
Al-Arabi SC (Saudi Arabia) players
Botola players
Saudi First Division League players
Saudi Second Division players
Expatriate footballers in Libya
Moroccan expatriate sportspeople in Libya
Expatriate footballers in Saudi Arabia
Moroccan expatriate sportspeople in Saudi Arabia
Association football forwards
Libyan Premier League players